Micropleura is a genus of flowering plants belonging to the family Apiaceae.

Its native range is Mexico to Colombia.

Species
Species:

Micropleura flabellifolia 
Micropleura renifolia

References

Mackinlayoideae
Apiaceae genera